Sir Walter de la Pole (November 1371 – 1434), of Dernford in Sawston, Cambridgeshire, was an English politician.

Family
Walter was the son and heir of the MP Sir Edmund de la Pole and his second wife.

Career
He was a Member (MP) of the Parliament of England for Cambridgeshire in 1411, November 1414, 1417, May 1421, 1422, 1423 and 1427.

References

1371 births
1434 deaths
English MPs 1411
People from Sawston
English MPs November 1414
English MPs 1417
English MPs May 1421
English MPs 1422
English MPs 1423
English MPs 1427